was a village located in Shimajiri District, Okinawa Prefecture, Japan. As of 2003, the village had an estimated population of 5,947 and a density of 602.53 persons per km2. The total area was 9.87 km2. On January 1, 2006, Chinen, along with the town of Sashiki, and the villages of Ōzato and Tamagusuku (all from Shimajiri District), was merged to create the city of Nanjō.

History
According to the Chūzan Seikan (1650), the creation goddess, Amamikyu, built Chinen Castle soon after forming the Ryukyu Islands. Chinen was important for later lords and kings because of its many holy sites, most notably Sefa-utaki.

The village of Chinen (pronounced shi-nen) was appropriated by the United States in 1948 for the purpose of building a secret Central Intelligence Agency operated logistics base, under US Army cover, known as Camp Chinen.  Camp Chinen was closed after it was exposed in The Pentagon Papers.  The Pentagon Papers revealed a 1961 memo from General Edward Lansdale to General Maxwell Taylor which states that a CIA support base in Okinawa at Camp Chinen housed a covert prison, in addition to a paramilitary training, research and logistics facility.  The memorandum read: 

Upon its closure as a CIA station in July 1972, Camp Chinen served as a US Army Special Forces training center, and as a language school for U.S. soldiers studying Japanese and Korean, and for Japanese forces studying English. Camp Chinen closed in 1975.

References

Dissolved municipalities of Okinawa Prefecture